Ann Mitchell (born 1939) is a British actress.

Ann or Anne Mitchell may also refer to:

Ann Mitchell (cricketer) (born 1945), Australian cricketer
Anne Mitchell (born 1950), American educator
Anne P. Mitchell (born 1958), American attorney and chief executive
Ann Katharine Mitchell (1922–2020), British cryptanalyst and author

See also
Kerri-Ann Mitchell (born 1983), Canadian sprinter